Alvan Clark & Sons was an American maker of optics that became famous for crafting lenses for some of the largest refracting telescopes of the 19th and early 20th centuries. Founded in 1846 in Cambridgeport, Massachusetts, by Alvan Clark (1804–1887, a descendant of Cape Cod whalers who started as a portrait painter), and his sons George Bassett Clark (1827–1891) and Alvan Graham Clark (1832–1897). Five times, the firm built the largest refracting telescopes in the world. The Clark firm gained "worldwide fame and distribution", wrote one author on astronomy in 1899.

The  Dearborn telescope (housed successively at the University of Chicago, Northwestern University and Adler Planetarium) was commissioned in 1856 by the University of Mississippi. The outbreak of the Civil War prevented them from ever taking ownership.  As a result, it was being tested in Cambridgeport when Alvan Graham observed Sirius B in 1862.

In 1873 they built the  objective lens for the refractor at the United States Naval Observatory. In 1883, they build the  telescope for the Pulkovo Observatory in Russia, the  objective for the refractor at Lick Observatory was made in 1887, and the  lens for the Yerkes Observatory refractor, in 1897, only ever exceeded in size by the lens made for Great Paris Exhibition Telescope of 1900.

The company also built a number of smaller instruments, which are still highly prized among collectors and amateur astronomers.

The company's assets were acquired by the Sprague-Hathaway Manufacturing Company in 1933, but continued to operate under the Clark name.  In 1936, Sprague-Hathaway moved the Clark shop to a new location in West Somerville, Massachusetts, where manufacturing continued in association with the Perkin-Elmer Corporation, another maker of precision instruments.  Most of Clark's equipment was disposed of as scrap during World War II, and Sprague-Hathaway itself was liquidated in 1958.

See also 

 Chabot Space & Science Center, Oakland, California
 Charles Sumner Tainter

References

 Deborah Jean Warner and Robert B. Ariail, Alvan Clark & Sons, artists in optics (2nd English ed.)  Richmond, VA. : Willmann-Bell, in association with National Museum of American History, Smithsonian Institution, 1995 (1996 printing), 298 p. 
 Timothy Ferris, Seeing in the Dark Simon & Schuster 2002; 117p. 

Defunct technology companies of the United States
Telescope manufacturers
Companies established in 1846
Instrument-making corporations
Companies based in Cambridge, Massachusetts
Defunct companies based in Massachusetts
1846 establishments in Massachusetts